Robertschochia sullivani is a primitive species of Taeniodont mammal from the early Paleocene of North America. It is the type species of genus Robertschochia. The genus is named for Robert M. Schoch.

References

Cimolestans
Paleocene mammals
Paleocene genus extinctions
Paleocene mammals of North America
Fossil taxa described in 1993